William Leitch or Will Leitch or Bill Leitch may refer to:

 William Leitch (scientist) (1814-1864), Scottish astronomer and rocket visionary
 William Leitch (footballer) (1863–1943), Tasmanian footballer, businessman and sports administrator
 William T. Leitch (1808–1885), mayor of Madison, Wisconsin, 1862–1865
 William Leighton Leitch (1804–1883), Scottish landscape watercolour painter and illustrator
Will Leitch  founding editor of the Gawker Media sports blog Deadspin
Will Leitch (Northern Irish journalist)
Bill Leitch, Canadian curler List of teams on the 2011–12 World Curling Tour